Night Shift is the sixth studio album by the rock band Foghat. It was released in 1976 by Bearsville Records.

The album peaked at No. 36 on the Billboard 200. It has sold more than 500,000 copies.

Production
Night Shift was the first Foghat album to include bassist Craig MacGregor, who had toured with the band in support of Fool for the City. The album was produced by Dan Hartman.

Critical reception
MusicHound Rock: The Essential Album Guide called the album "a consistent serving of meat-and-potatoes hard rock." Record Collector wrote that "the title track is Foghat boogie at its very best, while their version of 'Take Me To The River' is one of the best you’ll ever hear."

Track listing
 "Drivin' Wheel" (Dave Peverett, Rod Price) - 5:11/4:30
 "Don't Run Me Down" (Peverett) - 6:32
 "Burnin' the Midnight Oil" (Peverett) - 5:38
 "Night Shift" (Peverett, Price) - 5:32
 "Hot Shot Love" (Peverett) - 4:00
 "Take Me to the River" (Al Green, Mabon "Teenie" Hodges) - 4:40/3:22
 "I'll Be Standing By" (Peverett, Price) - 5:53
 "New Place to Call Home" (Peverett, Price) - 2:58 (Bonus track on 2006 remaster; listed on album cover but not the label)

Personnel
Lonesome Dave Peverett - lead vocals, guitar, heavy breathing
Rod "The Bottle" Price - guitar, slide guitar, steel guitar, vocals
Roger Earl - drums, percussion
Craig MacGregor - bass guitar, backing vocals

Charts

Certifications

References

1976 albums
Foghat albums
Albums produced by Dan Hartman
Bearsville Records albums